Bellangry, New South Wales is a rural locality of Mid-North Council and a Civil Parish of Macquarie County on the Mid North Coast of New South Wales.

The locality is within National Parks.

The Birpai (also known as Birrbay) people have lived in this area for more than 40,000 years.

References

Mid North Coast
Towns in New South Wales
Forests of New South Wales